The Sacambaya River is a river of Bolivia in the La Paz Department.

See also
 Amutara River
List of rivers of Bolivia

References
Rand McNally, The New International Atlas, 1993.

Rivers of La Paz Department (Bolivia)